Tamer (Tämer) is a Yam language of Yanggandur in southeast Merauke Regency, Indonesia. It forms a dialect continuum with Smerki (Smärki), and indeed goes by that name.

References

Tonda languages
Languages of western New Guinea